The Agia Sophia Stadium, also known by its commercial name OPAP Arena, is the home stadium of AEK Athens FC. With an all-seater capacity of 31,100, it is the third largest football stadium overall in Greece. It is located in Nea Filadelfeia, a northwestern suburb of Athens, Greece. Built in 2022 on the site of Nikos Goumas Stadium, the former ground of the club, the stadium is the most contemporary stadium in Greece.

Starting in 2023, the stadium will host the home matches of the Greece national football team. The stadium will host the 2024 UEFA Europa Conference League final.

Name
The commercial name of the stadium, OPAP Arena, was picked after OPAP – Greek Organisation of Football Prognostics S.A. secured the naming rights for five years, starting from 2022 and the original name of the stadium, Agia Sophia, named after the Greek-built former cathedral Hagia Sophia, was picked in order to commemorate the roots of the club from the city of Constantinople (nowadays Istanbul).

History

In 1926, land in Nea Filadelfeia that was originally set aside for refugee housing was donated as a training ground for the Greek refugees. A stadium was built at the site in 1930, named "Nikos Goumas", and became the home ground of AEK Athens FC.

In 2003, Giannis Granitsas, president of AEK at the time, advocated for demolishing the stadium at the interest of erecting a new one at the same location, citing that the stadium was seriously damaged from the 1999 Athens earthquake.  His plan was to build a new stadium at the same site, which would include also a basketball indoor hall and a mall.  The goal was for the stadium to be ready until the 2004 Summer Olympics.

However, shortly after the construction of the new stadium were halted by the Council of State, which decided that the construction plans of the stadium were contrary to the Constitution of Greece.

In 2005, Dimitris Melissanidis was a candidate for the presidency of AEK, and presented a plan for the construction of a stadium at the area of Nikos Goumas, bearing the name Hagia Sophia.  However, he lost the elections.

In 2007, AEK Athens FC's president Demis Nikolaidis was developing a project to build a 50,000-capacity stadium at Ano Liosia. The plan was canceled due to a lack of fan support and lack of funds.

After the bankruptcy and relegation of AEK Athens FC in 2013, Dimitris Melissanidis took up the reorganization of the club and recovered the plan of Hagia Sophia in a press conference held on 10 July 2013.

The first presentation of the stadium took place on 2 October 2013 in the Miltos Kountouras hall at the Nea Filadelfia High School. The project manager of the stadium Dimitris Andriopoulos announced the first features and facilities. The stadium will fulfill the criteria to be a four-category in the UEFA stadium categories, it will have a capacity of 32,500 and will have 40 suites. There will be a museum about the Greek refugees who left from Asia Minor in 1922. It will offer 1,500–2,000 jobs during its construction and 250 - 400 permanent jobs when it will be constructed.  The stadium's construction was expected to begin in 2014 and finish by 2015. The first images of the stadium were also exposed. The stadium is designed after the Walls of Constantinople where the club is originated from, and it will resemble a castle from the outside.

The grand presentation of the stadium took place on 6 November 2013 at the Onassis Cultural Center in Athens, which will contribute financially to the construction of the stadium.  A symbolic fund was also donated by the Ecumenical Patriarchate of Constantinople.  Technical information about the stadium were presented and its facilities were illustrated in a 20-minute video.

On 2 January 2015, the municipality of Filadelfeia-Chalkidona filed a complaint at the Council of State against the decision of the management of forests of administration of Athens, that allocates 0.6 hectares from the Grove of Nea Filadelfeia. Also, 17 citizens of the municipality of Filadelfeia-Chalkidona filed a complaint on 1 December 2014 about the same matter.

The case was heard at the Council of State on 6 March 2015.  The decision was issued on 5 June 2015, and it rejected the claims of the municipality and the citizens as unsubstantive and obscure.

The plan for the building of the stadium was released in the public consultation by the Ministry of Productive Reconstruction, Environment and Energy on 22 July. The process would be completed in 45 days. The municipality of Filadelfeia-Chalkidona filed an application for an extension of the public consultation for an extra 45 days, which was accepted.  The consultation was finally concluded on 24 November 2015.

On 28 January 2016, the meeting of the Administrative Regiοn of Attica approved the Study of the Environmental Impact of the project.

The minister of Environment and Energy, Panos Skourletis, signed the Study of Environmental impact of the stadium on 31 March 2016.

The planning permission was acquired from the Ministry of Environment on 25 July 2017.

Funding 
The net construction cost is estimated around € 81,700,000.  The funding will be completed in three stages.  The first phase of construction will cost € 25,000,000; the second phase € 20,000,000 and the third € 14,700,000.  The Administrative region of Attica will fund the stadium with € 20,000,000.  The sum left will be funded by Dikefalos 1924, a company that was founded for the construction of the stadium.

Construction 
The construction of the stadium began with earthworks on 28 July 2017.  The first phase of construction consisted of excavations and retaining works, which according to the initial planning would last for 5 months. Eventually, the first phase was completed on 5 December 2017.

On 6 February 2018, it was announced that the company «ERMONASSA SA» would undertake the completion of the second phase regarding the construction of the stadium.  These include, according to the official announcement, the remaining earthworks, the reinforced concrete main structure of the stadium, the construction of the concrete reinforced and prestressed pillars, and finally the construction and installation of the stands.  The completion of this phase is planned to last 14 months.  The works began on 12 February 2018. The third and final phase started on 30 March 2020 and was completed in early September 2022.

Facilities

OPAP Arena offers the following facilities, amenities and attractions.

 A small church of Hosios Loukas, in honour of AEK Athens FC former president Loukas Barlos
 Double dressing rooms for tournaments
 32,500 capacity
 Conference room
 VIP Entrance
 VIP Area
 VVIP Members Club
 Cigar Lounge
 40 suites
 Executive suite
 AEK Boutique
 AEK Athens FC History Museum
 Museum of Greek Refugees
 OPAP betting shop
 Panoramic view restaurant
 Traditional coffee shop
 Traditional shoe shop & locksmith
 Double-headed eagle statue (stadium main entrance)

Opening ceremony and matches

The stadium's opening ceremony took place on 30 September 2022.

AEK Athens beat Ionikos 4–1 in their new stadium's opening match on 3 October 2022, a match conducted for the sixth fixture of the 2022–23 Greek Super League.

On 7 March 2023, the Hellenic Football Federation committee announced Agia Sophia stadium as the home ground of Greece for the UEFA Euro 2024 qualifying round. However, Greece will play its first international game in Agia Sophia stadium earlier this year against Lithuania.

Record

{| class="wikitable" style="text-align:center"
|-
! Team
! Competition
! Matches
! Wins
! Draws
! Losses
! GF
! GA
! GD
|-
| rowspan="9"| AEK Athens
| Super League 1
| 11
| 10
| 0
| 1
| 27
| 5
| +22
|-
| Greek Cup
| 4
| 4
| 0
| 0
| 11
| 0
| +11
|-
| UEFA
| 0
| 0
| 0
| 0
| 0
| 0
| 0
|-
| Total
| 15
| 14
| 0
| 1
| 38
| 5
| +33
|-

{| class="wikitable" style="text-align:center"
|-
! Team
! Competition
! Matches
! Wins
! Draws
! Losses
! GF
! GA
! GD
|-
| rowspan="9"| Greece
| FIFA World Cup Qualifiers
| 0
| 0
| 0
| 0
| 0
| 0
| 0
|-
| UEFA Euro Qualifiers
| 0
| 0
| 0
| 0
| 0
| 0
| 0
|-
| UEFA Nations League
| 0
| 0
| 0
| 0
| 0
| 0
| 0
|-
| Exhibition Games
| 0
| 0
| 0
| 0
| 0
| 0
| 0
|-
| Total
| 0
| 0
| 0
| 0
| 0
| 0
| 0
|-

See also
 Nikos Goumas Stadium

References

External links
 Agia Sophia Stadium on agiasofia.today

Sports venues in Athens
Football venues in Greece
Multi-purpose stadiums in Greece
AEK Athens F.C.